This Is Big Audio Dynamite is the debut studio album by English band Big Audio Dynamite, led by Mick Jones, the former lead guitarist and co-lead vocalist of the Clash. It was released on 1 November 1985 by Columbia Records. The album peaked at No. 27 on the UK Albums Chart and at No. 103 on the Billboard 200, and was certified gold by the BPI. Three singles were released from the album, all of which charted in the UK. "The Bottom Line" barely made the Top 100, peaking at No. 97, becoming their lowest charting single, whereas its follow-up single "E=MC²" became their only Top 20 hit, peaking at No. 11, and becoming their best-selling single. The last single from the album, "Medicine Show", became their last single to chart within the Top 40 under the original line-up, peaking at No. 29. The music video for "Medicine Show", directed by Don Letts, featured two other former members of the Clash, Joe Strummer and Paul Simonon as police officers as well as John Lydon of the Sex Pistols and Public Image Ltd.

A remastered Legacy Edition was released in 2010 with a second disc composed of alternate mixes and versions. In 2016, independent vinyl reissue label Intervention Records reissued the album on 180-gram vinyl.

Album cover
The album's cover depicts most of the band dressed in cowboy clothing as a four piece band, minus keyboardist Dan Donovan who took and designed the photo.

Track listing

Personnel
Credits are adapted from the This Is Big Audio Dynamite liner notes.

Big Audio Dynamite
 Mick Jones — lead and backing vocals; guitars
 Don Letts — lead and backing vocals; FX sound effects
 Dan Donovan — keyboards
 Leo "E-Zee Kill" Williams — bass; backing vocals
 Greg Roberts — drums; drum machine; backing vocals

Production and artwork
 Mick Jones — producer
 Paul "Groucho" Smykle — engineer; mixing
 Johnny Shinas — assistant engineer at Redan Rec
 Renny Hill — assistant engineer at Sarm West Studios
 Adam "Flea" Newman — technician  "dynamite"
 Dan Donovan — sleeve artwork; photography

Samples used on the album
Medicine Show

Sampled liberally throughout this song are sound bites from four motion pictures, three of them Spaghetti Westerns. This list is based on order of appearance.
 "Get three coffins ready." (Clint Eastwood from A Fistful of Dollars)
 "Who the hell is that? One bastard goes in and another comes out....I'm innocent of everything!" (Eli Wallach from The Good, the Bad and the Ugly)
 "You makin' some kinda joke?" (A Fistful of Dollars)
 "I don't think it's nice, you laughin'." (Eastwood from A Fistful of Dollars)
 "Wanted in fourteen counties of this State, the condemned is found guilty of crimes of murder, armed robbery of citizens, state banks and post offices, the theft of sacred objects, arson in a state prison, perjury, bigamy, deserting his wife and children, inciting prostitution, kidnapping, extortion, receiving stolen goods, selling stolen goods, passing counterfeit money, and contrary to the laws of this State, the condemned is guilty of using marked cards...Therefore, according to the powers vested in us, we sentence the accused here before us, Tuco Benedicto Pacifico Juan Maria Ramirez ('Known as The Rat') and any other aliases he might have, to hang by the neck until dead. May God have mercy on his soul. Proceed." (The Good, the Bad and the Ugly; "Known as The Rat" was uttered by Eastwood.)
 Ennio Morricone's main theme to The Good, The Bad and The Ugly.
 "Duck, you sucker!" (James Coburn from Duck, You Sucker!)
 "I don't have to show you any stinkin' badges!" (Alfonso Bedoya from The Treasure of the Sierra Madre)
 Laughter from The Treasure of the Sierra Madre.

Sony
 Joe Strummer crowing from the Clash song "London Calling"

E=MC²
 Several samples from the cult film Performance (1970) directed by Donald Cammell and Nicolas Roeg. The music video mirrors the reference by using clips from several of Roeg's films, including Don't Look Now (1973) and The Man Who Fell to Earth (1976).

Sudden Impact
 The two note choral motif (Aaah aaah) heard throughout the song is a sample of the Close Encounters of the Third Kind (1977) soundtrack.

References

External links
 
 

1985 debut albums
Big Audio Dynamite albums
Columbia Records albums
Experimental rock albums by English artists
Sampledelia albums